Piperberget  is a mountain ridge to the east of Harestua, Viken in southern Norway. Piperberget lies just to the northeast of Langpiperen lake and is 611m at its highest peak.

References 

Mountains of Viken